Khalid Mumin is an American educator who is the secretary-designate of education of Pennsylvania. He was the superintendent of the Lower Merion School District.

Mumin is from Philadelphia. He earned a bachelor's degree from the Shippensburg University of Pennsylvania. He completed a master's degree from Pennsylvania State University and a doctorate from the University of Pennsylvania.

Mumin started his education career as a second-grade teacher in Scotland, Pennsylvania. He worked for six years in the Reading School District in Reading, Pennsylvania, including as the district's superintendent.

Mumin is married to Latrice Mumin, an assistant superintendent of Chester Upland School District.

Selected works

References 

Living people
Year of birth missing (living people)
Place of birth missing (living people)
Secretaries of Education of Pennsylvania